The Rural Municipality of Sifton is a rural municipality (RM) in the south-west portion of the Canadian province of Manitoba.

History
The RM was incorporated in 1883. The former town of Oak Lake, located within Sifton, annexed by the RM on January 1, 2015 as a requirement of The Municipal Amalgamations Act, which required municipalities with a population less than 1,000 to amalgamate with neighbouring municipalities. The Government of Manitoba initiated these amalgamations in order for municipalities to meet the 1997 minimum population requirement of 1,000 to incorporate a municipality.

Geography
The most prominent geographical feature in the RM is Oak Lake. Other lakes include Plum Lakes and Maple Lake. The Assiniboine River runs near the northern border of the RM and at the extreme south-east corner of the RM is the Souris River. Other notable rivers include Pipestone Creek and Plum Creek.

Communities 

 Algar
 Belleview
 Deleau
 Findlay
 Griswold
 Oak Lake
 Oak Lake Beach
 Ralston
 Routledge

Demographics 

Attractions 
In 2016, the Nature Conservancy of Canada bought 127 acres of land on the Oak Lake Sand Hills, east of Oak Lake. The property is a mixture of wetlands and rolling sandy hills and contains eleven uncommon and at-risk species.

Transportation 
The following is a list of highways in the RM:
 Manitoba Highway 1
 Manitoba Highway 2, also known as the Red Coat Trail
 Manitoba Highway 21
 Manitoba Provincial Road 254
 Manitoba Provincial Road 255
 Manitoba Provincial Road 543

References

External links 

2015 establishments in Manitoba
Manitoba municipal amalgamations, 2015
Rural municipalities in Manitoba
Populated places disestablished in 2015
2015 disestablishments in Manitoba